The Comoé Chimpanzee Conservation Project, CCCP, is a research and conservation project created in October 2014 by Juan Lapuente with the support of Prof. K. Eduard Linsenmair, from Würzburg University. Its main objectives are to study and help to preserve the population of chimpanzees resident in Comoé National Park  and its neighboring areas, in Ivory Coast.

The project initially developed with the support of the Comoé Research Station. CCCP has worked in collaboration with Max Planck Institute for evolutionary anthropology and received funding from Fundació Barcelona Zoo, Arcus Foundation and Fish and Wildlife Service. The project keeps a close collaboration with the managers of the park, OIPR, to implement measures that help to the conservation of the chimpanzees and other key species, such as elephants and great predators.

Conservation outcome 
The work of the project in collaboration with OIPR has helped to secure the area where the chimpanzees live and it helped to return the park to the UNESCO list of World Heritage

Scientific outcome 
During the first four years of the project, CCCP gained deep knowledge of the Western chimpanzees (Pan troglodytes verus) living in savanna-woodland mosaic in Ivory Coast, discovering several new behaviors that are still under study. Comoé chimpanzees realize a behavior exclusive from this area, water dipping with specialized tools and also realize a variant of the recently described accumulative stone throwing 
The project is studying and documenting through camera-trap videos and ethnoarchaeological methods many aspects of the ecology, behavior and tool use of these chimpanzees

Social outcome 
The project trains and incorporates local villagers of the area as research assistants, realizes awareness raising campaigns and contributes to the local economy. By 16 July 2019, the date of edition of this article, 28 students and researchers of 11 different countries have participated in the project, including six African students.

References

External links 
 Camera trap video of the animals of the park
 Water dipping behavior videos
 Male chimpanzees patrolling in the savanna
 Juvenile chimpanzee learning tool use from its mother
 Chimpanzee intergroup contact mitigation
 Large chimpanzee mixed party walking through the dry forest

Animal conservation organizations
Primate conservation
Nature conservation in Ivory Coast